Jean Paulo Fernandes or simply Jean (born 1 October 1972), is a Brazilian retired footballer who played as a goalkeeper. He was born in Guarujá, São Paulo.

His son, also named Jean, is a footballer and a goalkeeper. He too was groomed in Bahia's youth setup.

Honours
Bahia
Campeonato Baiano: 1994, 1998, 1999

Cruzeiro
Campeonato Mineiro: 1997
Copa Libertadores: 1997

Vitória
Campeonato Baiano: 1999, 2000, 2002

External links
 zerozero.pt
 Guardian Stats Centre
 CBF

1972 births
Living people
People from Guarujá
Brazilian footballers
Association football goalkeepers
Fluminense de Feira Futebol Clube players
Esporte Clube Bahia players
Cruzeiro Esporte Clube players
Esporte Clube Vitória players
Guarani FC players
Associação Atlética Ponte Preta players
Sport Club Corinthians Paulista players
Santa Cruz Futebol Clube players
Footballers from São Paulo (state)